Gayang is a common traditional Filipino ethnic Moro weapon in Sulu archipelago. It is a double-edged sword about 24-28 inches in length with a typical hook hilt grip to prevent slipping.
The sword was believed to be from Borneo and was a Philippines' version of Mandau, a traditional sword of the Dayaks of Borneo.

References

Arnis
Filipino swords
Weapons of the Philippine Army
Malayan swords
Blade weapons